Sir Jeremy Russell Baker (born 9 February 1958) is a British judge of the High Court of Justice of England and Wales. He is correctly styled Mr Justice Jeremy Baker, conveniently distinguishing him from Andrew Baker.

Career
Baker was called to the bar at Middle Temple in 1979. He was appointed an Assistant Recorder in 1996. In 1999, he became a King's Counsel. He was appointed a Recorder in 2000 and a circuit judge in 2010. On 25 March 2013, he was appointed a Justice of the High Court, and was assigned to the King's Bench Division. He received the customary knighthood in the 2013 Special Honours.

Notable cases
In May 2022, he jailed Imran Ahmad Khan for 18 months after he was convicted of sexual assault of a 15-year old boy. He had been an MP before his conviction.

See also
Manchester Arena bombing

References 

1958 births
Living people
Members of the Middle Temple
21st-century English judges
Queen's Bench Division judges
Knights Bachelor
English King's Counsel